or  is a method of killing fish which maintains the quality of its meat. The technique originated in Japan, but is now in widespread use. It involves the insertion of a spike quickly and directly into the hindbrain, usually located slightly behind and above the eye, thereby causing immediate brain death. After spiking the brain, a thin needle or piece of wire is inserted into the spinal column to prevent any further muscle movement. When spiked correctly, the fish fins flare and the fish relaxes, immediately ceasing all motion. Destroying the brain and the spinal cord of the fish will prevent reflex action from happening; such muscle movements would otherwise consume adenosine triphosphate (ATP) in the muscle, and as a result produce lactic acid and ammonia, making the fish sour, soggy and less tasteful. Furthermore, the blood contained in the fish flesh retracts to the gut cavity, which produces a better coloured and flavoured fillet, and prolongs shelf life. This method is considered to be the fastest and most humane method of killing fish. -killed fish is sought-after by restaurants as it also allows the fish to develop more umami when aged.

It is very similar to the technique used on frogs in laboratories called spiking or pithing.

Another technique in APEC Air shipment of live and fresh fish and seafood guidelines is described as follows: "A cut is made toward the front of the flatfish severing the major artery and the spinal cord. Placement of the cut is made to preserve the greatest amount of flatfish flesh. This paralyzes the flatfish. A second cut is made in the tail to hasten the removal of blood. Flatfish are then chilled slowly to maintain circulation and facilitate the bleeding process. After the flatfish have been bled, they are transferred to a salt/ice water slurry and chilled to −12°C."

 has been successfully used manually in the tuna and yellowtail industries, along with limited use in sport and game fishing, as it provides a rapid slaughter technique. An alternative to death by exsanguination,  is used and the fish put straight into ice or flash freezing.

References

Further reading
 FAO: Care of the catch 
 Comparison of Common Slaughter Methods for Farmed Finfish Seafood innovations.
 Angus L, Malcolmson L and Nicolson A  (1995) Improving the Quality of Farmed Salmon by "Iki Jime" Harvesting Fisheries Development Note, North Atlantic Fisheries College.

Smart, Alastair Fish Welfare at Harvest: Killing Me Softly in Welfare underwater: issues with aquatic animals, Proceedings of the 2004 RSPCA Australia Scientific Seminarheld at the Telstra Theatre, Australian War Memorial, Canberra, 26 February 2004, pp. 25-27

External links
 Humane killing database www.ikijime.com
 Humane Killing of Live Seafood Western Australia Department of Fisheries.
 Preparing fish FISH.govt.au.
 Japanese Food Report 
 About Ikijime & nerve removal 
 Iki-jime Poster - Phone App 

Fishing equipment
Japanese cuisine terms
Animal killing